Haw Creek is a stream in Pike County in the U.S. state of Missouri. It is a tributary of the Salt River.

Haw Creek was so named on account of black haw timber in the area.

See also
 List of rivers of Missouri

References

Rivers of Pike County, Missouri
Rivers of Missouri